The Warwickshire Championships also known as the Warwickshire County Championships founded on 1 August 1882 was a men's and women's grass court tennis tournament held at Leamington Spa, Warwickshire, England from  1882 to 1938 as part of the pre-open era tennis tour. The tournament is still being staged to today as a local county championship.

History
The Warwickshire Championships were established on 1 August 1882, and first staged at Jephson Gardens. At the same meeting held in August 1882 a dual tournament was stage called the Leamington Open Tournament (1882-1931).

At the inaugural Warwickshire Championships, the Warwickshire men's singles was won by Mr. Erskine Gerald Watson (brother of Maud Watson), the  Warwickshire men's doubles was won by Mr. G.S. Raynor and Mr. Edward Lake Williams, the Warwickshire women's doubles was won by Miss. J.C. Kay and Miss. W.E. Graham, and the Warwickshire pairs was won by Erskine Gerald Watson and Maud Watson.

References

Sources
 County Championships. .lta.org.uk. Lawn Tennis Association UK.
 Nieuwland, Alex. "Tournament – Warwickshire Championships". www.tennisarchives.com. A. Nieuwland.
 Routledges Sporting Annual (1883) George Routledge and Son. London.
 Warwickshire County Tennis Championships. Leamington Lawn Tennis & Squash Club". lltsc.co.uk.

Grass court tennis tournaments
Defunct tennis tournaments in the United Kingdom
Tennis tournaments in England